Dhaka Cantonment Girls Public School and College (Bengali: ঢাকা ক্যান্টনমেন্ট গার্লস পাবলিক স্কুল এন্ড কলেজ) is a high school in Dhaka Cantonment, Dhaka, Bangladesh. The institution was established in 2005. It is managed by Bangladesh Army and primarily for the children of Army personnel. Pupils from the civilian section also can study in this school and college.

References 

High schools in Bangladesh
Educational Institutions affiliated with Bangladesh Army